Antony ministry may refer to:

First Antony ministry, the Kerala government headed by A. K. Antony from 1977 to 1978
Second Antony ministry, the Kerala government headed by A. K. Antony from 1995 to 1996
Third Antony ministry, the Kerala government headed by A. K. Antony from 2001 to 2004

See also
 A. K. Antony